Robert Emmett Staton is an American academic administrator and former business executive who served as the 18th president of Presbyterian College in Clinton, South Carolina. He is the former chairman and CEO of Colonial Life & Accident Insurance Company.

Early life and education 
Staton attended Presbyterian College, graduating in 1968, and the University of South Carolina School of Law, graduating in 1971.

Career 
Staton served as the chairman and CEO of Colonial Life & Accident Insurance Company until the late 1990s. After retiring from that position, he joined the board of trustees at Presbyterian, a position in which he served from 1997 until 2006.

He served as PC's executive vice president for external relations from 2007 to 2012. On July 1, 2015, one day after Presbyterian president Claude Lilly announced his intention to resign, Staton was named as the interim replacement and was later announced as the permanent president of the college, taking office on July 15, 2015. It was announced on May 12, 2020, that Staton would retire effective December 31, 2020.

Staton was awarded an honorary Doctorate of Public Service at Presbyterian's 2015 commencement.

Run for State Superintendent of Education

On January 4, 2006, Staton announced his candidacy for the position of South Carolina State Superintent of Education. He finished second in a contested Republican primary and conceded the race on June 14, 2006, having received just shy of 35% of the vote compared to Karen Floyd's 50.5%.

Personal life 
Staton is married to his wife, Phyllis, a former manager at Palmetto Health, with whom he has four children. Staton currently serves as an elder at Cherokee Presbyterian Church, located in Gilbert, South Carolina.

References 

Living people
American academic administrators
American business executives
Presbyterian College alumni
University of South Carolina School of Law alumni
Presbyterian College faculty
Presidents of Presbyterian College
Year of birth missing (living people)